South Carolina Highway 194 (SC 194) is a  state highway in the U.S. state of South Carolina. The highway connects Saluda and rural areas of Saluda County.

Route description
SC 194 begins at an intersection with U.S. Route 378 (US 378; North Jennings Street and Travis Avenue) in Saluda, within Saluda County. It travels to the north and almost immediately curves to the northeast before leaving the city limits. The highway crosses over Burnets Creek and Big Creek. Farther to the northeast is a crossing of Indian Creek, just before an intersection with SC 395 (Kempson Bridge Road). The highway then curves to the southeast and goes in an easterly direction to meet its eastern terminus, an intersection with SC 391 (Prosperity Highway), at a point south of Stoney Hill.

Major intersections

See also

References

External links

SC 194 at Virginia Highways' South Carolina Highways Annex

194
Transportation in Saluda County, South Carolina